Mauro Gilardi (born 21 December 1982) is an Italian professional football player.

External links
 
 AIC profile (data by football.it) 

1982 births
Living people
Italian footballers
F.C. Pavia players
Olbia Calcio 1905 players
A.S.D. Victor San Marino players
A.S. Gubbio 1910 players
Serie C players
Pol. Monterotondo Lupa players
Association football midfielders
Pol. Alghero players